The 1903 Florida State College football team represented Florida State College in the sport of American football during the 1903 college football season. The team was led by head coach W.W. Hughes and posted a 3–2–1 record  and won a claim to the State Championship. With no formal nickname or mascot, the Florida State College football team was known simply as the "Florida State College Eleven".

Before the season

Uniforms
The Florida State players wore gold uniforms with a large purple F on the front. Their pants were lightly padded, but their upper bodies were largely unprotected. Leather helmets with ear guards covered their heads, and shoehorn-shaped metal nose guards were strapped across their faces.

Coaching staff
The football team chose new officers in May 1903. T.M. Shackelford was elected Manager and Ed Watson Captain; Professor W.W. Hughes remained as coach.

Schedule

Season summary

Week 1: Bainbridge Giants
To open the season, Florida State crushed the Bainbridge Giants 22–0.

Week 2: Bainbridge Giants

The second game against Bainbridge was controversial. Florida State rode the train to Bainbridge, but the Tallahassee sportswriter stayed home, due to the weather. Therefore, the only account of the game was provided by the Bainbridge press.

Neither team scored during the first half, but Florida State "succeeded in pushing the ball over the line" in the second half. During the second half, an "unpleasantness" occurred. According to the Bainbridge account, W.W. Hughes, who was officiating the game, refused to surrender the duty after the first half. Bainbridge protested several of Hughes calls and demanded that he step down. "An unusual amount of wrangling" resulted, and after the game Hughes did not allow his team to attend the prearranged dance." Florida State left Bainbridge immediately after the game. Florida State had won the game 5–0. Bainbridge citizens were outraged and considered Hughes conduct "not that of a man who was trying to promote good feeling between the two towns." Hughes considered the Georgians too unpleasant, and Florida State never played Bainbridge again.

Week 3: East Florida Seminary
The East Florida Seminary team beat FSC 16–0. "The victors had the home team beat at every point. A large crowd witnessed the game."

Week 4: Georgia Tech
Florida State played Georgia Tech at Piedmont Park in Atlanta on November 7, "a sunny and mild autumn day." Georgia Tech made two touchdowns in the first half after "easy gains." In the second, Clarke, Georgia Tech's left tackle, "made one of the prettiest bucks...which had been seen" and scored a third time. By the end of the game, Georgia Tech had defeated Florida State 17–0. Though Florida schools had played each other since 1901, this was the first time one played a Southern Intercollegiate Athletic Association (SIAA) opponent. Fuzzy Woodruff called it the first evidence of intercollegiate football in Florida.

Week 5: Florida
Florida State College beat the University of Florida (at Lake City)
, 12–0. Florida State had planned on playing former Clemson star Jack "Pee Wee" Forsythe at fullback. When UF found out, they threatened to leave. Florida State's Captain, A.B. Clark, said the team wouldn't use Forsythe if Florida did not play its physical education director, J.D. Jeffery. Both Forsyth and Jeffery likely were professionals; certainly, neither was a student. Both teams agreed to the terms, and the game went on as scheduled."

Week 6: Stetson

Florida State finished the 1903 season against Stetson in the Florida Times-Union's Championship Cup. Because both Florida State and Stetson had beaten the University of Florida, the winner of the game would be crowned State Champion.

"It was a clean game and well played by both. Stetson kicked off and in three plays got the ball on downs and held it for a touchdown which was made by a series of line bucks."

"In the second half Stetson kicked off and held Tallahassee well, with varying results, until the last ten minutes when Tallahassee, by a series of line plays, claimed by Stetson to be illegal, using four men massed back of the line, made a touchdown, but failed to kick goal."

The game ended in a 5–5 tie.  Neither team was awarded the Times-Union Trophy.

Roster
The original line-up played the entire game, both offense and defense. Substitutes replaced injured players.

Line
LE – 
LT – 
LG – 
C  – 
RG – 
RT –
RE –

Backfield
QB –
LH – 
RH – 
FB –

References

Florida State
Florida State Seminoles football seasons
Florida State College football